Tibor Zátek (born 14 June 1971) is a former Slovak football player.

Zátek played for Dukla Banská Bystrica before moving to Czech Baník Ostrava in 1997. In 1999, he moved to 1. FC Košice in Slovakia. After playing another two seasons at MFK Ružomberok, Zátek moved to Austria, where he played for several division clubs.

External links
 
 Profile at SV Mattersburg website

Slovak footballers
Slovakia international footballers
1971 births
Living people
FC Baník Ostrava players
MFK Ružomberok players
SV Mattersburg players
Slovak expatriate footballers
Slovak expatriate sportspeople in Austria
Expatriate footballers in the Czech Republic
Expatriate footballers in Austria
Association football defenders
People from Čadca
Sportspeople from the Žilina Region